Possession Rocks are two small rock outcrops just east of Northcliffe Glacier, above which they rise to 160 metres. Discovered by the Eastern Sledge Party under Frank Wild of the Australasian Antarctic Expedition, 1911–14, and so named following a ceremony in December 1912 of claiming this area for the British Crown.

References

Rock formations of Queen Mary Land